Skånevik is a village in Etne municipality in Vestland county, Norway.  The village is located along the Skånevikfjorden, near the entrance to the Åkrafjorden.  The village lies across the fjord from the village of Utåker in neighboring Kvinnherad municipality.  The municipal centre of Etnesjøen lies about  straight south across a mountain, although one must drive about  around the mountain to get there.
 
Historically, the village was the administrative centre of the old municipality of Skånevik which existed until 1965. Skånevik Church was the main church for the old municipality, and it is still in use in the village today.

The village is a transportation hub for the area since it is a regular port of call for a cross-fjord ferry route. The ferry goes from Skånevik to Utåker to Sunde i Matre. There are also ferries that go from Skånevik to Bergen.

References

Villages in Vestland
Etne